Heinz Zemanek (actually Heinrich Josef Zemanek) (1 January 1920 – 16 July 2014) was an Austrian computer pioneer who led the development, from 1954 to 1958, of one of the first complete transistorised computers on the European continent. The computer was nicknamed Mailüfterl — Viennese for "May breeze" — in reference to Whirlwind, a computer developed at MIT between 1945 and 1951.

Life
Heinz Zemanek went to a secondary school in Vienna and earned his Matura in 1937. He then started to study at the University of Vienna. In 1940, Zemanek was drafted into the Wehrmacht, where he served in a "communication unit" and also as a teacher in an Intelligence Service School. Returning to studying radar technology he earned his Diplom in 1944 with the help of University of Stuttgart professor Richard Feldtkeller (1901–1981).

After the war Zemanek worked as an assistant at the university and earned his PhD in 1951 about timesharing methods in multiplex telegraphy. In 1952 he completed the URR1 (Universal Relais Rechner 1, i.e., Universal Relay Computer 1). He died at the age of 94 on 16 July 2014.

The Vienna Lab
The IBM Laboratory Vienna, also known as the Vienna Lab, was founded in 1961 as a department of the IBM Laboratory in Böblingen, Germany, with Professor Zemanek as its first manager. Zemanek remained with the Vienna Lab until 1976, when he was appointed an IBM Fellow. He was crucial in the creation of the formal definition of the programming language PL/I.

For several years, Zemanek had been a lecturer at the Vienna University of Technology, which features a lecture hall named in his honor. He was also a long-time member of the International Federation for Information Processing, of which he was president from 1971 to 1974.

Scouting
Professor Zemanek joined the Boy Scouts in 1932 and served as Scout Leader, International Secretary of Austria from 1946 to 1949 and International Commissioner of the Pfadfinder Österreichs from 1949 to 1954.

Honours and awards
Austrian Cross of Honour for Science and Art, 1st class (2005)
Gold Decoration for Services to the City of Vienna
Joseph Johann Ritter von Prechtl Medal from the Technical University of Vienna
Leonardo da Vinci Medal of the European Society for the Education of Engineers
Wilhelm Exner Medal (1972).
Rudolf Kompfner Medal of the Faculty of Electrical Engineering and Information Technology at the Technical University of Vienna (2010)
Member of the European Academy of Sciences and Arts
Hero of Uzbekistan
Eduard Rhein Ring of Honor (Eduard Rhein Foundation, 1998)
Heinz-Zemanek-Preis, an award for extraordinary accomplishments in the field of computer science, was named for him
Kardinal-Innitzer-Preis (2003) – for his lifetime accomplishments

Literature
Bekanntes & Unbekanntes aus der Kalenderwissenschaft. Munich: Oldenbourg, 1978
Kalender und Chronologie. Munich: Oldenbourg, 1990
Weltmacht Computer. Esslingen: Bechtle, 1991
Das geistige Umfeld der Informationstechnik. Berlin: Springer, 1992
Unser Kalender. Vienna: Wiener Kath. Akad., 1995
Vom Mailüfterl zum Internet. Vienna: Picus-Verlag, 2001
Anekdoten zur Informatik. Innsbruck: Studien-Verlag, 2001

Notes

References

External links

Heinz Zemanek website
Heinz Zemanek university home page
Oral history interview with Heinz Zemanek, Charles Babbage Institute, University of Minnesota.  Zemanek discusses his engineering education and work in radar technology during World War II. Zemanek then focuses on the development of computers in Austria: magnetic drums and magnetic memory, the Mailüfterl computer, LOGALGOL and other compilers, the University of Vienna, where Zemanek worked on his computer, the subsequent sponsorship of the project by International Business Machines Europe, and ALGOL and PL/I language standards development.
Picture (.jpg)
Life of Zemanek

1920 births
2014 deaths
Scientists from Vienna
People associated with Scouting
Scouting and Guiding in Austria
University of Vienna alumni
Austrian computer scientists
Academic staff of TU Wien
Programming language designers
IBM Fellows
Recipients of the Austrian Cross of Honour for Science and Art, 1st class
Members of the European Academy of Sciences and Arts
Austrian military personnel of World War II